Charismatic (March 13, 1996 – February 19, 2017) was an American Thoroughbred racehorse best known for winning the first two legs of the Triple Crown of Thoroughbred Racing in 1999.

Early in his career, Charismatic was entered in claiming races but he improved rapidly during his three-year-old year. After winning the 1999 Kentucky Derby and Preakness Stakes, Charismatic had the lead in the stretch of the Belmont Stakes before suddenly falling back and finishing third. He was quickly pulled up by jockey Chris Antley, who dismounted and cradled the horse's fractured foreleg to prevent further injury. The aftermath of the Belmont was later named the National Thoroughbred Racing Association Moment of the Year.

Charismatic never raced again, but was still voted 1999 Horse of the Year. He successfully recovered from his injuries to become a stallion, first in the United States and then in Japan. On October 26, 2016, it was announced that Charismatic was being retired from stud to live at Old Friends Equine near Lexington, Kentucky. He died just over two months after arriving.

Background
Charismatic was a chestnut horse with four white stockings on his legs and a white stripe on his forehead. He was bred under a foal-sharing arrangement between William S. Farish and the Parrish Hill Farm of Dr. Ben and Tom Roach. His sire was Summer Squall, who had won the 1990 Preakness Stakes. Summer Squall was a half-brother to leading sire A.P. Indy as both were out of the outstanding broodmare Weekend Surprise by Secretariat. Summer Squall's sire Storm Bird, by Northern Dancer, was also the sire of Storm Cat, another leading sire. Charismatic's dam was Bali Babe, by Drone. Bali Babe, winless in two starts, was 16 when she foaled Charismatic, a fairly advanced age for a broodmare.

Charismatic was purchased as a weanling by Bob and Beverly Lewis for $200,000. He was trained by D. Wayne Lukas and ridden in the Triple Crown races by Chris Antley.

Racing career
Charismatic lost his first five starts as a two-year-old. Lukas then took a calculated risk by entering him in a maiden claiming race on November 21, 1998, with a "tag" of $62,500. Lukas later commented, "I don't think I've ever been fooled so much by a horse... I felt I wasn't pushing the right buttons. But I felt he hadn't won a race and needed some confidence." The gamble paid off when the colt went unclaimed and then won the race.

Charismatic raced once more as a two-year-old, losing in allowance company, and then started his three-year-old season the same way, finishing fifth in both an allowance race and the Santa Catalina Stakes. Lukas decided to again roll the dice, entering the colt in another claiming race on February 11, 1999. "Quite frankly I had given up on the horse," said Bob Lewis. "I wanted to get back as much of that $200,000 (purchase price) as I could. The reason he was in that race was because Wayne wanted him to see what it was like on the front end instead of the back end." Again unclaimed, Charismatic finished second but was given the win when the first-place finisher was disqualified.

Lukas then put the colt on a demanding schedule, racing him eight days later on February 19 in an allowance race, followed by a start on March 6 in the El Camino Real Derby. Charismatic finished second in both those races, but could only manage a fourth in the Santa Anita Derby on April 6. Lukas shipped the horse to Keeneland for the Lexington Stakes on April 18, the last chance for a win on the Kentucky Derby trail. Charismatic responded with a record setting performance in his first stakes victory.

Charismatic was a 31-1 longshot in the 125th Kentucky Derby on May 1, facing a field of 18 other horses. Valhol set a slow early pace tracked by Cat Thief, who took over the lead rounding the final turn. Charismatic raced in mid-pack for the first three-quarters of a mile, then started closing ground rapidly on the leaders. He passed Cat Thief in deep stretch, then withstood a late charge from Menifee to win by a head. Cat Thief, also trained by Lukas, was third. The time for  miles was a slow 2:03.29 The win denied trainer Bob Baffert his third straight Derby victory. His three entries, two of which were co-favorites at 9-2 odds, failed to make the top three.

Charismatic also won the 124th Preakness Stakes on May 15 with a time of 1:55.20 for the -mile distance. He was 1½ lengths ahead of Menifee, again second, with Badge finishing third. Despite the Kentucky Derby win, Charismatic was not the Preakness favorite, posting 8-1 odds. Menifee was the favorite at 5–2.

At the 131st Belmont Stakes on June 5, Charismatic was a 2-1 favorite, with Menifee second in odds at 7–2. The rivalry between Charismatic and Menifee was compared to Affirmed and Alydar in 1978. Charismatic looked like he would become the first horse in 21 years to win the Triple Crown, taking the lead at the 3/16ths pole. However, the horse abruptly slowed down and lost the lead to eventual winner Lemon Drop Kid with 1/8 mile to go, ultimately finishing third behind second-place Vision and Verse.

Sensing that something was wrong with the horse, jockey Chris Antley eased Charismatic up in the final furlong, jumped off right after the finish line and then held up the colt's left front leg. Charismatic's foreleg had fractured in multiple places involving the cannon bone and sesamoids, and Antley's actions probably saved his life by avoiding a more catastrophic injury. As it was, the horse was taken off the track in a van and underwent surgery the next day. His surgeon Stephen Selway said, "The fracture [of the cannon bone] happened first. As the horse went on, the damaged piece hit the sesamoids and caused them to fracture." The damaged area of the cannon bone extended about six inches: four screws were inserted to provide stability. There was no sign of pre-existing injury.

The footage of a tearful Antley holding Charismatic was selected by racing fans as the 1999 National Thoroughbred Racing Association Moment of the Year.

Charismatic finished his career with 5 wins, 2 places and 4 shows in 17 career starts, for total earnings of $2,038,064. He won the Eclipse Awards for 3-year-old Colt of the Year and Overall Horse of the Year for 1999.

Retirement
In 2000, Charismatic entered stud at Lane's End Farm in Kentucky. After the 2002 season, he was shipped to Japan, where he stood at the JBBA's Shizunai Stallion Station. His fee was ¥500,000 (about $5,000) for a live foal. At the time of his retirement from stud in October 2016, Charismatic had sired 371 starters from 424 foals of racing age and 263 winners who had combined earnings of more than $44.5 million. His best runner in the United States was Sun King, who won four graded stakes and earned more than $2.2 million. In Japan, his most successful offspring was Wonder Acute, a multiple group stakes winner.

On October 26, 2016, it was announced that Charismatic would be retired from stud and would reside at Old Friends Equine near Lexington, Kentucky. The costs of transporting the horse were covered by a fund set up by his former owners and additional donations from Tito's Handmade Vodka. "We are ecstatic that we are able to participate in bringing horse racing stars like Charismatic back home, where they can be revered by the public and help raise awareness for the cause," said Eric Barlund, Tito's vice president of sales. "Charismatic's star shone very brightly, though only for a few weeks in 1999," said Beverly Lewis. "We are all looking forward to visiting him when he arrives." Charismatic died on the morning of February 19, 2017 at Old Friends due to severe bleeding caused by a pelvic fracture. He was thought to have sustained the injury during the night without sounding alarm, and did not appear to have been in distress when he was found. The cause of the fracture was unknown.

Shortly after his passing, Charismatic's best son, Sun King, arrived at Old Friends to live out his retirement.

A film about Charismatic and Chris Antley was produced by Asylum Entertainment and directed by Steven Michaels, Joel Surnow, and Jonathan Kochas for ESPN's 30 for 30 series. It aired on Tuesday, October 18, 2011, at 8 p.m.

Pedigree

References

External links
Charismatic at the JBBA website (in Japanese)
Charismatic at the Japan Bloodstock Information System (in English)
Charismatic's Kentucky Derby
Preakness winners
Charismatic: Three-year-old Male of the Year

1996 racehorse births
2017 racehorse deaths
Racehorses bred in Kentucky
Racehorses trained in the United States
American Thoroughbred Horse of the Year
Kentucky Derby winners
Preakness Stakes winners
Eclipse Award winners
American Grade 1 Stakes winners
Thoroughbred family 10-a
Old Friends Equine Retirement